Samuel Benchetrit (born 26 June 1973) is a French writer, actor, scenarist, and director.

Biography
Benchetrit was born to a family of Romani, Sephardic and Ashkenazi Jewish ancestry.

At age fifteen, he quit school to focus on photography.

Born in Champigny-sur-Marne, Benchetrit was married to French actress Marie Trintignant from 1998 until her murder by her lover Bertrand Cantat in 2003. On 17 April 1998 the couple had a child, . From 2005 to 2012 Benchetrit was in a relationship with French actress Anna Mouglalis; they have a daughter, Saül, born on 7 March 2007. In 2016, while shooting his fifth film, Dog, Benchetrit fell in love with Vanessa Paradis, whom he directed. They married in June 2018.

Works

Books
 2000 : Récit d'un branleur (Tale of a Jerk-Off)
 2005 : Les Chroniques de l'Asphalte (Asphalt Chronicles) (tome I)
 2007 : Les Chroniques de l'Asphalte (Asphalt Chronicles) (tome II)
 2009 : Le Cœur en dehors
 2010 : Les Chroniques de l'Asphalte, (Asphalt Chronicles) (tome III)
 2015 : Chien Edition Grasset

Theatre
 2001 : Comédie sur un quai de gare (Comedy on a Railway Platform)
 2005 : Moins deux (This title is a rich pun, translating as: "ASAP", "Two Down", "Two Below", and "Minus Two")

Films
As director
 2000 : Nouvelle de la tour L (short film) ("Story of Tower L")
 2003 : Janis et John (Janis And John)
 2007 : J'ai toujours rêvé d'être un gangster (I Always Wanted to Be a Gangster)
 2008 : YSL film
 2015 : Asphalte
 2017 : Dog

As actor
 2005 : Backstage (Director : Emmanuelle Bercot)
 2014 : Les Gazelles (Director : Mona Achache)
 2017 : Chacun sa vie et son intime conviction (Director : Claude Lelouch)

References

External links

 
 "Samuel Benechetrit", The Daily Beast

1973 births
Living people
People from Champigny-sur-Marne
French film directors
French male film actors
21st-century French Sephardi Jews
French male screenwriters
French screenwriters
21st-century French male actors